Johanna Ernst (born 16 November 1992) is an Austrian professional Sport climber. She competes both in Lead climbing and bouldering, and she also climbs outdoor.

Biography 
Ernst began climbing when she was 8 years old. Initially, she only competed in the lead climbing discipline. In 2008, when she was 16, she participated in her first Lead Climbing World Cup and won it, earning three gold, two silver and one bronze medals. In the same year she also won the Rock Master climbing festival and the Lead Climbing European Championship in Paris.

In 2009, she won the Lead Climbing World Championships in Qinghai and, for the second time in a row, the  Lead Climbing World Cup. As a decoration of honor for these outstanding achievements, in 2009 she was also awarded the Gold Medal for Services to the Republic of Austria.

In 2010, she could not compete in the Lead Climbing World Cup due to an ankle sprain caused by a fall during the Bouldering World Cup on June 4 in Vail. However, in September she was able to earn the silver medal at the European Championships in Imst.

Rankings

Climbing World Cup

Climbing World Championships

Climbing European Championships

Number of medals in the Climbing World Cup

Lead

Rock climbing

Redpointed routes 
:
 Open your Mind - Santa Linya (ESP) - 6 April 2012

:
 La Fabelita - Santa Linya (ESP) - 5 April 2012

:
 Minas Tirith - Ötztal (AUT) - 7 August 2008

Onsighted routes 
:
 Santa Linya - Santa Linya (ESP) - 3 April 2009

:
 La Mare del Tano - Santa Linya (ESP) - 3 April 2009
 Flix Flax - Terradets (ESP) - 1 April 2009
 White Winds - Schleierwasserfall (AUT) - 30 March 2008

References

External links 

1996 births
Living people
Austrian rock climbers
Competitors at the 2009 World Games
Competitors at the 2013 World Games
20th-century Austrian women
21st-century Austrian women
IFSC Climbing World Championships medalists
IFSC Climbing World Cup overall medalists